Stan Wawrinka defeated Rafael Nadal in the final, 6–3, 6–2, 3–6, 6–3 to win the men's singles tennis title at the 2014 Australian Open. It was his first major title. With the win, Wawrinka became the first man outside the Big Four to win a major since Juan Martín del Potro won the 2009 US Open. He also became the first man to defeat the top two seeds at a major since Sergi Bruguera at the 1993 French Open, defeating top-seed Nadal and second-seed Novak Djokovic. Nadal was attempting to complete the double career Grand Slam; he would achieve the feat eight years later.

Djokovic was the three-time defending champion, but lost in the quarterfinals to Wawrinka in a rematch of the previous year's fourth-round match. This ended Djokovic's 25-match winning streak at the Australian Open, 28-match winning streak overall, and streak of 14 consecutive major semifinals.

Roger Federer made his 57th consecutive major appearance, breaking the all-time record he had jointly held with Wayne Ferreira.

This was the first major appearance for future US Open champion and world No. 3 Dominic Thiem; he lost in the second round to Kevin Anderson.

Stéphane Robert became the first lucky loser to reach the fourth round, defeating fellow lucky loser Martin Kližan in the third round — the first such encounter at a major since the 1973 Wimbledon Championships.

Seeds

 Rafael Nadal (final)
 Novak Djokovic (quarterfinals)
 David Ferrer (quarterfinals)
 Andy Murray (quarterfinals)
 Juan Martín del Potro (second round)
 Roger Federer (semifinals)
 Tomáš Berdych (semifinals)
 Stan Wawrinka (champion)
 Richard Gasquet (third round)
 Jo-Wilfried Tsonga (fourth round)
 Milos Raonic (third round)
 Tommy Haas (first round, retired because of a shoulder injury)
 John Isner (first round, retired because of a foot injury)
 Mikhail Youzhny (second round)
 Fabio Fognini (fourth round)
 Kei Nishikori (fourth round)

 Tommy Robredo (fourth round)
 Gilles Simon (third round)
 Kevin Anderson (fourth round)
 Jerzy Janowicz (third round)
 Philipp Kohlschreiber (withdrew due to hamstring injury)
 Grigor Dimitrov (quarterfinals)
 Ernests Gulbis (second round)
 Andreas Seppi (second round)
 Gaël Monfils (third round)
 Feliciano López (third round)
 Benoît Paire (third round)
 Vasek Pospisil (third round, withdrew because of a back injury)
 Jérémy Chardy (third round)
 Dmitry Tursunov (second round)
 Fernando Verdasco (second round)
 Ivan Dodig (second round, retired because of severe cramping)

Qualifying

Wildcards

Draw

Finals

Top half

Section 1

Section 2

Section 3

Section 4

Bottom half

Section 5

Section 6

Section 7

Section 8

References
General

Men drawsheet on ausopen.com

Specific

External links
 2014 Australian Open – Men's draws and results at the International Tennis Federation

Men's Singles
Australian Open (tennis) by year – Men's singles